CDN Channel 37 (Cadena de Noticias TV S.A.) is a Dominican commercial broadcasting company founded in 1996, broadcasting on channel number 37.

History 

CDN was founded on January 1, 1998, by the Dominican Popular Bank, broadcasting on Channel Number 37. It produces news, special coverage, and sports content. In 1999, CDN expanded by adding more reporters and broadcasts. The content was diversified into productions covering the distinct areas of art, health, economy, debates and opinion. CDN also created a digital platform to expand its scope. They are the official channel of Major League Baseball in the Dominican Republic.

In 2005, CDN news and sports was included in the group Multimedios del Caribe led by Manuel Estrella and Félix García.

Another channel, CDN2, was launched in 2008. It contained alternative programs for all ages, and in 2014 it became the only Dominican television channel specializing in 24-hour sports coverage, now with the name of CDN SportsMax.

In 2013, CDN was relaunched in alliance with Provider, S.A., led by the journalist Nuria Piera, to investigate high-level national and international affairs. Piera has hosted the show Nuria: Journalistic Investigation on CDN for 29 years. They formed NCDN – a new format that offers a different perspective on the production and content of the programming. Their interactive online broadcasting platform and technology was also overhauled.

In 2015 news spanish anchor Pere Pont worked there as the international news editor.

In 2018 Nuria Piera left the channel's company to Alba Nelys Familia.

Target demographic 
CDN content is appropriate for all ages and demographics.

Broadcast extent 
CDN is broadcast at the national level in the Dominican Republic. Internationally, it is available online.

CDN Channel 37 is a broadcast television station in Santo Domingo, Dominican Republic, providing news and entertainment for the Dominican Republic

International alliances with other media 
VOA – Voice of America (US)
New York 1 – News (US)
NTN24 – Latin America
CB24 – Central America
DW – Deutsche Welle (Germany)
RT – Russia Today (Russia)
CCTV – China
Sistema TV – Puerto Rico
Canal 15 – Nicaragua
MTN Mundo TV – Honduras
Canal 10 - Uruguay
América TV – Peru
RCN – Colombia
Canal 13 – Chile
Canal 21 – Panama
Mega Visión – El Salvador

International coverage 
CDN has covered the following international events:
Honras Fúnebres al Presidente Hugo Chávez – Venezuela
Elecciones Presidenciales en Venezuela – Candidato electo: Nicolás Maduro
Elección del Obispo Jorge Mario Bergoglio como el nuevo Papa de la Iglesia Católica – Roma, Italia, Papa Francisco.
Cumbre Iberoamericana – Veracruz, México
Reunión Bilateral entre la República Dominicana y Puerto Rico (2015) 
Visita histórica de la Secretaria Adjunta de la Región Roberta Jacobson a Cuba
Cumbre de las Américas – Panamá
Visita del Secretario de Estado John Kerry a Cuba
Visita histórica del Papa Francisco a Cuba
Elecciones Presidenciales y Congresuales en Haití (2015)
Juicio histórico al Ex Nuncio de la República Dominicana – Joseph Wesolowski
Visita histórica del presidente de los Estados Unidos, Barack Obama, a Cuba.

References

External links
 Official Web page

24-hour television news channels
Television stations in the Dominican Republic